Welcome to Demon School! Iruma-kun has been serialized in Akita Shoten's shōnen manga magazine Weekly Shōnen Champion since March 2, 2017. Akita Shoten has collected its chapters into individual tankōbon volumes. The first volume was released on July 7, 2017. As of March 2023, thirty-one volumes have been released.

Volume list

Chapters not yet in tankōbon format 
277. 
278. 
279. 
280. 
281. 
282. 
283. 
284. 
285. 
286. 
287. 
288. 
289. 
290. 
291.

References 

Welcome to Demon School! Iruma-kun